Elsa O'Connor (1905–1947) was an Argentine stage and film actress.

Life and career 
The daughter of actress and journalist Amelia Monti, who introduced her to the stage, she debuted with the Blanca Podestá company in 1923. O`Connor was awarded the prize to the best dramatic actress for her role in Himeneo and Celos. Her most successful role in theatre was in 1944 as Bella in the play Luz de Gas, by Narciso Ibáñez Menta, an adaptation of Patrick Hamilton's Gas Light. 

In cinema, O'Connor also won the award of the Argentine Film Critics Association to the best support actress for the 1944 film The Desire. 

Elsa O'Connor died in Montevideo from a traumatic brain injury on 7 April 1947, several days after falling down a staircase while acting in the play La Gata.

She was the mother of actor Horacio O'Connor (1928-1997) and the grandmother of tenor Martín O'Connor.

Selected filmography
 The Life of Carlos Gardel (1939)
 Sensational Kidnapping (1942)
 Seven Women (1944)
 The Desire (1944)

References

Bibliography
 Finkielman, Jorge. The Film Industry in Argentina: An Illustrated Cultural History. McFarland, 24 Dec 2003.

External links

1905 births
1947 deaths
Argentine film actresses
Argentine stage actresses
People from Buenos Aires

Deaths onstage